Urban evolution refers to the heritable genetic changes of populations in response to urban development and anthropogenic activities in urban areas. Urban evolution can be caused by mutation, genetic drift, gene flow, or evolution by natural selection. Biologists have observed evolutionary change in numerous species compared to their rural counterparts on a relatively short timescale.

Strong selection pressures due to urbanization play a big role in this process. The changed environmental conditions lead to selection and adaptive changes in city-dwelling plants and animals. Also, there is a significant change in species composition between rural and urban ecosystems.

Shared aspects of cities worldwide also give ample opportunity for scientists to study the specific evolutionary responses in these rapidly changed landscapes independently. How certain organisms (are able to) adapt to urban environments while others cannot, gives a live perspective on rapid evolution.

Urbanization 
With urban growth, the urban-rural gradient has seen a large shift in distribution of humans, moving from low density to very high in the last millennia. This has brought a large change to environments as well as societies.

Urbanization transforms natural habitats to completely altered living spaces that sustain large human populations. Increasing congregation of humans accompanies the expansion of infrastructure, industry and housing. Natural vegetation and soil are mostly replaced or covered by dense grey materials. Urbanized areas continue to expand both in size and number globally; in 2018, the United Nations estimated that 68% of people globally will live in ever-larger urban areas by 2050.

Three factors have come to the forefront as the main evolutionary influencers in urban areas: the urban microclimate, pollution, and urban habitat fragmentation. These influence the processes that drive evolution, such as natural and sexual selection, mutation, gene flow and genetic drift.

Urban microclimate 
A microclimate is defined as any area where the climate differs from the surrounding area. Modifications of the landscape and other abiotic factors contribute to a changed climate in urban areas. The use of impervious dark surfaces which retain and reflect heat, and human generated heat energy lead to an urban heat island in the center of cities, where the temperature is increased significantly. A large urban microclimate does not only affect temperature, but also rainfall, snowfall, air pressure and wind, the concentration of polluted air, and how long that air remains in the city.

These climatological transformations increase selection pressure. Certain species have shown to be adapting to the urban microclimate.

Urban pollution 
Many species have evolved over macroevolutionary timescales by adapting in response to the presence of toxins in the environment of the planet.  Human activities, including urbanization, have greatly increased selection pressures due to pollution of the environment, climate change, ocean acidification, and other stressors. Species in urban settings must deal with higher concentrations of contaminants than naturally would occur.

There are two main forms of pollution which lead to selective pressures: energy or chemical substances. Energy pollution can come in the form of artificial lighting, sounds, thermal changes, radioactive contamination and electromagnetic waves. Chemical pollution leads to the contamination of the atmosphere, the soil, water and food. All these polluting factors can alter species’ behavior and/or physiology, which in turn can lead to evolutionary changes.

Urban habitat fragmentation 
The fragmentation of previously intact natural habitats into smaller pockets which can still sustain organisms leads to selection and adaptation of species. These new urban patches, often called urban green spaces, come in all shapes and sizes ranging from parks, gardens, plants on balconies, to the breaks in pavement and ledges on buildings. The diversity in habitats leads to adaptation of local organisms to their own niche. And contrary to popular belief, there is higher biodiversity in urban areas than previously believed. This is due to the numerous microhabitats. These remnants of wild vegetation or artificially created habitats with often exotic plants and animals all support different kinds of species, which leads to pockets of diversity inside cities.

With habitat fragmentation also comes genetic fragmentation; genetic drift and inbreeding within small isolated populations results in low genetic variation in the gene pool. Low genetic variation is generally seen as bad for chances of survival. This is why probably some species aren’t able to sustain themselves in the fragmented environments of urban areas.

Urban evolution examples 
The differing urban environment imposes different selection pressures than the natural setting. Although there is widespread agreement that adaptation is occurring in urban populations,  there are almost no proven examples  almost all are cases of selection, reasoned speculation connecting to adaptive benefit, but no evidence of actual adaptive phenotype. At this time only six examples are demonstrated:

 Atlantic killifish (Fundulus heteroclitus) have evolved both whole-body chemical tolerance and aryl hydrocarbon receptors in several unconnected events.
 The peppered moth is an example of industrial melanism. These moths changed color from light to dark due to anthropogenic air pollution during the industrial revolution. The black melanism phenotype frequency saw a rise during the time of heavy air pollution and a fall after cleaner air became more normal again in cities.
 Acorn ants (Temnothorax curvispinosus) adapt to tolerate either heat island or lower rural temperatures.
 The water flea (Daphnia magna) has adapted to urban settings and displays the ability to better tolerate heat.
 Ragweed (Ambrosia artemisiifolia) has very divergent flowering phenology.
 Holy hawksbeard (Crepis sancta) develops larger size, later flowering, delayed senescence, higher photosynthetic capacity, higher water use efficiency, and higher leaf nitrogen.

Some interesting cases of possible adaptation which remain insufficiently proven are:

 Bobcats (Lynx rufus) in Los Angeles, CA, USA were selected for immune genetics loci by an epidemic of mange there, however Serieys et al. 2014 does not provide proof of resistant phenotype.
 Water dragon lizards (Intellagama lesueurii) in Brisbane, Australia do show divergence. Littleford-Colquhoun et al. 2017 find divergence of both morphology and genetics, but remind readers that they have not demonstrated that this is adaptive.

Claimed examples of urban adaptation include:

 The common blackbird (Turdus merula)  may be the first example of actual speciation by urban evolution, due to the urban heat island and food abundance the urban blackbird has become non-migratory in urban areas. The birds also sing higher and at different times, and they breed earlier than their rural counterparts which leads to sexual selection and a separated gene pool. Natural behavioral differences have also formed between urban and rural birds. 
 Urban Anole lizards (Anolis) have evolved longer limbs and more lamellae compared with anolis lizards from forest habitats. This because the lizards can navigate the artificial building materials used in cities better.
 The urban Hawksbeard plant (Crepis) has evolved a higher percentage of heavier nondispersing seeds compared to rural hawksbeard plants, because habitat fragmentation leads to a lower chance of dispersing seeds to settle.
 White clover (Trifolium repens) has repeatedly adapted to urban environments on a global scale due to genetic changes in a heritable antiherbivore defense trait (hydryogen cyanide) in response to urban-rural changes in drought stress, vegetation and winter temperatures. 

The London Underground mosquito (Culex pipiens f. molestus) has undergone reproductive isolation in populations at higher latitudes, including the London Underground railway populations, where attempted hybridizations between molestus and the surface-living Culex pipiens pipiens are not viable in contrast to populations of pipiens and molestus in cities at lower latitudes where hybrids are found naturally.

In one case selection is widely expected to occur and yet is not found:

 Coyotes (Canis latrans) in New York City, USA show no immune selection in the work of DeCandia et al. 2019.

Genetic traits 
Some already existing genetic traits can have an influence on the outcome which species can thrive in urban environments. The difference in standing genetic variation, which normally would not affect a species’ population, can result in a dissimilarity in ability to adapt to environmental changes. The predisposition of some species to certain aspects of urban habitats also plays a role in how capable these species are to adapt to city life. Aspects, such as the physical similarity of their original niche, trophic requirements or behavior all make some species seem pre-adapted to their new anthropogenic environments.

Urban environments can also lead to an evolutionary trap, this occurs when a sudden anthropogenic change in the environment causes an organism to make a decision that normally would be adaptive, but now results in a maladaptive outcome, although better alternatives are available. This leads to selection (natural when it kills the animal and sexual when is distracts from copulating)

Behavioral Changes 
Residing in urban environments can alter the behavior of species as they adjust over time to living in highly modified habitats in close proximity to humans. Some traits such as brain size have been shown to affect a species' skills in adapting to urban areas by allowing greater versatility in their ability to adapt. Even among species with the adaptations to live in urban areas, interactions with other present species such as competitors can limit the adaption of species to urban environments to the more dominant of the interacting species. This further limits the species' ability to thrive in urban environments, but for the species that do settle into urban environments changes in behavior have been shown both within and between species.

Avian Adaptations 
Avian perception of humans as a threat alters as birds adjust to living in urban environments, causing them to become less fearful of nearby humans. Birds living in urban areas have a shorter flight initiation distance, the distance a potential threat can approach before the bird retreats, than rural birds of the same species. Additionally, species with a higher number of generations living in urban environments are less cautious around humans than species that arrived more recently in urban areas.  As urban birds are less cautious around people they also show higher levels of aggression in defending their territory and nests against humans than their rural counterparts. Caution in urban animals around humans also varies from city to city, affected by both the positive and negative human actions taken against a species within each urban center as the species associate the actions with the threat level that humans pose and respond accordingly.

Birdsong has also been greatly altered due to urban influences, primarily due to the large amounts of low frequency noises caused by traffic, which is caused by soundwaves with longer wavelengths. While the frequency of an individual's birdsong does not change, over generations urban birds have developed a higher minimum frequency to be heard over the ambient low-frequency sounds. Urban birds also sing with a higher amplitude, or volume, than their rural counterparts, causing a greater impact on the distance birdsong travels than frequency does by projecting further. The effect of amplitude on birdsong in urban cities, in part as a result of the Lombard effect wherein the volume of an individual increases as the surrounding noise increases in order to be heard, was notable during the COVID-19 lockdowns where the amplitude of birdsongs dropped while still continuing to maintain high transmission distances. The effect of urbanization on birdsong also includes changes over generation in the frequency and distribution in dialect.

References 

Ecology terminology
Community ecology
Habitat
Ecological processes
Evolutionary ecology
City